Angela Russell may refer to:

 Angela Russell (swimmer) (born 1967), Australian swimmer
 Angela Russell (politician) (born 1943), American politician and civil rights activist
 Angela Russell (doctor) (1893–1991), Irish physician and social reformer